Sir David Okete Vuvuiri Vunagi,  (born 6 September 1951), is a retired Solomon Islands Anglican bishop and incumbent governor-general of Solomon Islands. He was the archbishop of Melanesia and bishop of the Diocese of Central Melanesia from 2009 to 2016.

Early life and education 
Vunagi was born in Samasodu, on Santa Isabel Island (Isabel Province), in what was then the British Solomon Islands Protectorate. He studied at KGVI Secondary School, from 1968 to 1973. He achieved a Diploma of Education in Science at the University of the South Pacific in 1976, and a M.B. of Education in Biology at the University of Papua New Guinea in 1982. Before serving as a priest, he was a teacher at the government school at KGVI and at the Selwyn College of the Church of Melanesia. Vunagi earned a Bachelor of Theology at St John's College, Auckland, in 1990. He earned a Master of Theology at the Vancouver School of Theology in 1998.

Career 
He was a teacher at the Bishop Patteson Theological College Kohimarama, in Solomon Islands, in 1992.

Vunagi later moved to Canada, where he was assistant priest at St. Anselm's Parish in the Diocese of New Westminster, British Columbia, from 1996 to 1998.

He returned afterwards to the Solomon Islands, where he was a priest in the Diocese of Ysabel. In 1999, he went back to teaching at the Selwyn College, where he was principal. He became Mission Secretary at the Provincial Headquarters of the Church of Melanesia, in 2000. Vunagi was elected the same year Bishop of the Diocese of Temotu, which he was until 2009. He was consecrated as a bishop and installed as the third Bishop of Temotu on 6 May 2001.

He was elected the 5th Archbishop and Primate of the Church of the Province of Melanesia on 4 March 2009, in a Provincial electoral board, held in Honiara, being enthroned on 31 May 2009.

He attended the Global South Fourth Encounter, in Singapore, from 19–23 April 2010, and was also represented at the Global South Conference that took place in Bangkok, from 18–20 July 2012.

Archbishop Vunagi left office on 6 September 2015, in a ceremony that took place at St. Barnabas Cathedral, in Honiara, attended by the nine bishops of the Anglican Church of Melanesia. He was succeeded as acting Primate by Nathan Tome, Bishop of Guadalcanal, the senior bishop of the province, until the election of the new Primate on 12 February 2016.

In June 2019, he became the only candidate to be the next Governor-General of Solomon Islands, the Queen's viceregal representative in the country, and officially took office on 7 July 2019.

Personal life 
Archbishop Vunagi is married to Mary Vunagi, the second child of Bishop Sir Dudley Tuti, and has three children; Dudley, Rusila and Douglas.

References 

1951 births
Living people
Governors-General of Solomon Islands
Knights Grand Cross of the Order of St Michael and St George
Solomon Islands Anglicans
Anglican archbishops of Melanesia
21st-century Anglican bishops in Oceania
21st-century Anglican archbishops
People from Isabel Province
Academic staff of Bishop Patteson Theological College